Davina Lucy Pascale McCall (born 16 October 1967) is an English television presenter. She was the presenter of the reality show Big Brother during its run on Channel 4 between 2000 and 2010. She also hosted Channel 4's Streetmate (1998–2001, 2016), The Million Pound Drop (2010–2015), Five Minutes to a Fortune (2013), and The Jump (2014–2017), as well as ITV's The Biggest Loser (2011–2012), Long Lost Family (2011–present), and This Time Next Year (2016–2019). McCall was a regular co-presenter of the Comic Relief annual telethons from 2005 to 2015.

From 2010 to 2014, McCall presented the Sky One dance competition show Got to Dance. Since 2020, she has been a judge on the ITV musical competition show The Masked Singer, and since 2021, a spin-off of the show, The Masked Dancer.

Early life and education
McCall was born on 16 October 1967 in Wimbledon, London, to a French mother, Florence (née Hennion) and an English father, Andrew McCall, a graphic designer and events organiser for Portsmouth Harbour Authority. At the age of three she went to live with her paternal grandparents in Surrey after the break-up of her parents' marriage.
Her mother Florence—whom McCall has described as something of a "wild child" and later, specifically as "an alcoholic"—returned to Paris, and McCall saw her only when on holidays.

McCall attended St Catherine's School, Bramley near Guildford, Surrey and Godolphin and Latymer Girls School, a private school in Hammersmith, West London. At secondary level, McCall studied for nine O levels and two A levels.

Career
McCall's first career was as a singer, and she had been performing in a band, Lazy Bear, while still at school. By age 19, she had decided to pursue a professional career as a solo classical artist, and briefly commenced classical vocal coaching.

Dissatisfied with her lack of success in the music industry, McCall gave up singing and took a job at Models 1 on the men's desk as a booker. Later she ran a restaurant for two years before a brief spell in Paris as a Moulin Rouge-style cabaret performer. On her return to London she worked on the nightclub scene as a hostess. Work in this period also included an appearance as a dancer in the video for the 1991 Kylie Minogue single "Word Is Out", wearing a striped sweater and beret in a nod to her French ancestry.

In 1994, McCall was hired as a presenter on Ray Cokes' Most Wanted on MTV Europe. She then presented Hitlist UK. In 1995, she went on to host the ITV late night game show God's Gift.

Channel 4

In 1998, McCall hosted cult dating show Streetmate in which she toured the country meeting single people and matching them up.

McCall was chosen as the presenter of the inaugural series of Big Brother, in which ten housemates entered a sealed house for up to nine weeks and their every move was filmed and then broadcast as a daily highlights television show. McCall hosted the weekly live eviction show, where one contestant would be removed from the house, until the last housemate became the winner. McCall also hosted the celebrity version Celebrity Big Brother, the first series of which ran for eight days in March 2001.

McCall's performance on the final night of the sixth series in 2005 attracted press attention and some complaints for her treatment of housemate Makosi Musambasi. In December 2007, McCall presented a New Year's edition of The Friday Night Project, entitled The Friday Night New Year Project 2007.

By the ninth series of Big Brother in 2008, McCall was earning a reported £85,000 per episode. Responding to tabloid claims before the series that she was about to quit Big Brother she said, "I'm not leaving ... They would have to kill me before I'd stop doing it". The ninth series proved to be a low point, however, becoming the least watched summer series in the show's history.

McCall became the regular presenter of the live Big Brother companion show Big Brother's Big Mouth for the tenth and eleventh series, after it was re-formatted into an hour-long show after the weekly live eviction show, having previously occupied the slot after each daily highlights show.

With audience figures falling, Channel 4 decided that the eleventh series in summer 2010 would be the last Big Brother broadcast on their channel, although the show's future was in the hands of the rights holder Endemol. After presenting the seventh and final series of Celebrity Big Brother in January 2010, she fronted her eleventh and final regular edition over the summer. As a finale to the series on Channel 4, McCall also presented the Ultimate Big Brother show, which started immediately after the main series, and featured selected past celebrity and non-celebrity housemates.

Having made the decision to leave the show after Ultimate Big Brother, McCall confirmed she would not be returning as host when Channel 5 announced in April 2011 that they had secured the rights to relaunch Big Brother in summer 2011. She gave her backing to Emma Willis as her replacement, stating she still believed the show had potential. Big Brother 2 and Ultimate Big Brother winner Brian Dowling was ultimately chosen to take over McCall's role as presenter of the Channel 5 version, though in 2013 Emma Willis became his successor as the new presenter.

In between the final celebrity and regular editions of Big Brother on Channel 4, McCall began presenting a new game show, The Million Pound Drop. The final episode aired on 20 March 2015, with the primetime series axed in 2016. On 14 July 2017, it was announced that the format would return as a daytime series under the name The £100K Drop.

From 2012 to 2016, McCall co-hosted charity telethon Stand Up to Cancer with Alan Carr, Christian Jessen and Adam Hills. As part of the 2014 telethon, McCall and Carr also hosted a companion series Stars at Your Service.

In April 2013, McCall presented one series of Five Minutes to a Fortune.

From January 2014 to March 2017, McCall presented reality competition The Jump which was broadcast live from Innsbruck and Kühtai in Austria. In 2016, McCall presented Make My Body Better on Channel 4.

Sky
Davina co-presented the first series of Prickly Heat alongside Julian Clary on Sky1. She was replaced by Denise van Outen for further two series.

On 20 December 2009, McCall began hosting reality programme Got to Dance. On 24 October 2014, it was confirmed that the show had been axed after five series. In 2015, McCall presented One Hundred and Eighty, a darts-based game show for Sky1.

ITV
McCall co-presented the six part series Birthrace 2000 with Lisa Riley in 1999, which featured couples trying to have the first baby of the millennium.

McCall co-presented four series of Don't Try This at Home for ITV. Her co-presenters were Kate Thornton, Paul Hendy and Darren Day.

When Don't Try This at Home ended in 2001, McCall continued with the channel, presenting series such as Popstars: The Rivals and The Vault (1st series) in 2002, Reborn in the USA in 2003 and  Love on a Saturday Night in 2004. She also hosted the British Academy Television Awards 2004 for ITV and again in 2006.

In 2011, McCall began hosting  The Biggest Loser and Long Lost Family. After just two series, it was announced that The Biggest Loser had been axed by ITV in September 2012. Long Lost Family, however, is still being broadcast on the channel, with McCall and Nicky Campbell as hosts.

In 2013, McCall presented Stepping Out which was seen as a rival to BBC One's Strictly Come Dancing.

In 2016, Davina presented a four-part factual series for ITV called Davina McCall: Life at the Extreme. From 2016 to 2019, she has presented three series of This Time Next Year for the channel.

In January 2017, McCall guest presented three episodes of This Morning alongside Phillip Schofield. She returned to guest present an episode in February 2018 with Ore Oduba.

McCall guest presented five episodes of The Nightly Show in March 2017. In 2018, she was the host of A&E Live, a three part series to commemorate 70 years of the NHS. On 9 September 2019, McCall was announced as a judge for The Masked Singer, the UK version of the international music game show Masked Singer. Series 1 aired in January 2020, and series 2 began airing in December 2020. On 4 March 2021, it was announced by ITV that McCall would be appearing as a judge on the brand new spin off show of The Masked Singer UK, The Masked  Dancer UK, which is set to air in spring 2021.

BBC
During 2005, McCall presented He's Having a Baby, where she followed and advised eight young men who were to become first-time fathers at various stages during the show's ten-week run. It received poor ratings.

McCall has been one of the co-presenters of the annual British charity telethons that are organised by Comic Relief on BBC One. Organised on an alternating comedy/sport theme and televised live in March, Red Nose Day has been co-hosted by McCall since 2005. She had previously presented or appeared on various related Comic Relief shows, including: The Record Breaker (1999), Naked Red Nose Ground Force in Practice and Say Pants to Poverty (2001), The Big Hair Do (2003) and Comic Relief Does Fame Academy (2005).

From early 2006, McCall fronted her own prime-time chat show, Davina. Receiving scathing reviews and with viewing figures falling to below half of the six million watching The Bill on ITV at the same time, the show was axed in April for not reaching expectations with McCall herself saying that the programme was "the worst mistake of her life".

UKTV
McCall presented her own show on the W channel from September 2017, called The Davina Hour.

Other ventures
In 2001, McCall appeared with Ed Byrne, Tristan Gemmill and Tameka Empson as the title character in Sam's Game, a Friends-style sitcom. Slammed by the critics, it aired just once. McCall has voiced the android Davina McCall in the 2005 Doctor Who episode "Bad Wolf", and in 2008 she played herself as both a human and a zombie in Dead Set, a five-part horror parody of Big Brother set in the house.

In documentary television, McCall has fronted Let's Talk Sex about sex education and how it is taught in the United Kingdom (which then had one of the countries of Europe with the highest teenage pregnancy levels). She also published a companion book to the series. McCall has also appeared in a video for schools called "Watch Over Me," talking about her drug addiction and peer pressure.

McCall is also the face of cosmetics brand Garnier in the United Kingdom.

In August 2014, McCall was one of 200 public figures who were signatories to a letter to The Guardian expressing their hope that Scotland would vote to remain part of the United Kingdom in September's referendum on that issue.

Personal life

Family

Her first marriage was to Andrew Leggett in 1997.

In June 2000 McCall married her second husband Matthew Robertson, presenter of Pet Rescue, at Eastnor Castle, Herefordshire. Together they had three children: two daughters and a son. In November 2017 the couple separated.

McCall's previous partners included family friend Eric Clapton. He also helped her when in her early 20s she developed a drug problem; it was only after overcoming this that she gained her own television show on MTV. She gave up smoking when she was 24.

McCall is fluent in French, as her mother is French.

Ancestry
McCall's ancestry was examined for a 2009 episode of Who Do You Think You Are?. With the help of historians Jean-Marc Berliere and Simon Kitson, McCall learned that she is the great-granddaughter of onetime Prefect of Police Célestin Hennion (1862–1915), and the great-great-great-granddaughter, on her father's side, of James Thomas Bedborough (1787–1860), a stonemason, councillor, Mayor, property developer and entrepreneur, who worked on Windsor Castle and Upton Park in Slough. Bedborough was said to be an illegitimate son of George IV according to a story told by McCall's grandmother, but this was neither proved nor disproved on the show.

Participants in the programme included Françoise Hennion (Hennion's granddaughter and McCall's mother's cousin) and Pierre, Hennion's son and McCall's grandfather. Pierre gave McCall his father's Royal Victorian Order medal. McCall met Alfred Dreyfus's great-granddaughter, Yael Ruiz, after learning of the part her ancestor Célestin Hennion played in the Dreyfus affair.

Charity work 
In February 2014, McCall undertook a BT Sport Relief challenge called 'Davina – Beyond Breaking Point', seven days of either running, swimming or cycling across the UK to raise money for the UK charity Sport Relief. This challenge was filmed by the BBC as a one-off 60-minute documentary which aired on 20 March 2014 at 21:00 on BBC One. During the live telethon, it was announced that McCall had raised over £2.2 million for Sport Relief 2014.

Filmography

Television 

Guest appearances

The Kumars at No. 42 (2001)
Top Gear (2005)
Room 101 (2007, 2017)
Question Time (2007)
The Paul O'Grady Show (2008, 2015)
Would I Lie to You? (2008, 2009)
Chris Moyles' Quiz Night (2009)
Who Do You Think You Are? (2009)
Alan Carr: Chatty Man (2009, 2010, 2012, 2013)
Celebrity Juice (2010, 2011, 2012, 2014)
A Comedy Roast (2010)
This Morning (2011, 2013, 2014, 2015)
The Jonathan Ross Show (2014)
Mel and Sue (2015)
Through the Keyhole (2015)
Alan Carr's 12 Stars of Christmas (2016)
Alan Davies: As Yet Untitled (2017)
John Bishop: In Conversation With... (2017)
Celebrity Catchphrase (2019)

Fitness DVDs

Davina: Power of 3 (released 27 December 2004)
Davina – My Three 30 Minute Workouts (released 5 December 2005)
Davina – My Pre & Post Natal Workouts (released 5 March 2007)
Davina – High Energy Five (released 3 December 2007)
Davina – Super Body Workout (released 8 December 2008)
Davina Fit (released 7 December 2009)
Davina – Body Buff (released 6 December 2010)
Davina – Ultimate Target (released 5 December 2011)
Davina Intense (released 10 December 2012)
Davina – Fit in 15 (released 2 December 2013)
Davina: 7 Minute Fit (released 26 December 2014)
Davina: 5 Week Fit (released 26 December 2015)
Davina: 30 Day Fat Burn (released 26 December 2016)
Davina: Toned in 10 (released 26 December 2017)

Bibliography
Davina's 5 Weeks to Sugar Free (released 8 January 2015)
Davina's Smart Carbs (released 31 December 2015)
Lessons I've Learned (released 22 September 2016)
Davina's Sugar-Free in a Hurry (released 29 December 2016)
Menopausing  (released 15 September 2022)

References

External links

Twitter

1967 births
Living people
English game show hosts
English people of French descent
English television actresses
English television presenters
English television talk show hosts
People educated at Godolphin and Latymer School
People educated at St Catherine's School, Bramley
People from Wadhurst
People from Wimbledon, London
Television personalities from London